This is a list of listed buildings in Angus, Scotland. The list is split out by parish.

 List of listed buildings in Aberlemno, Angus
 List of listed buildings in Airlie, Angus
 List of listed buildings in Arbirlot, Angus
 List of listed buildings in Arbroath And St Vigeans, Angus
 List of listed buildings in Arbroath, Angus
 List of listed buildings in Auchterhouse, Angus
 List of listed buildings in Barry, Angus
 List of listed buildings in Brechin, Angus
 List of listed buildings in Careston, Angus
 List of listed buildings in Carmyllie, Angus
 List of listed buildings in Carnoustie, Angus
 List of listed buildings in Cortachy And Clova, Angus
 List of listed buildings in Craig, Angus
 List of listed buildings in Dun, Angus
 List of listed buildings in Dunnichen, Angus
 List of listed buildings in Eassie And Nevay, Angus
 List of listed buildings in Edzell, Angus
 List of listed buildings in Farnell, Angus
 List of listed buildings in Fern, Angus
 List of listed buildings in Forfar, Angus
 List of listed buildings in Fowlis Easter, Angus
 List of listed buildings in Glamis, Angus
 List of listed buildings in Glenisla, Angus
 List of listed buildings in Guthrie, Angus
 List of listed buildings in Inverarity, Angus
 List of listed buildings in Inverkeilor, Angus
 List of listed buildings in Kingoldrum, Angus
 List of listed buildings in Kinnell, Angus
 List of listed buildings in Kinnettles, Angus
 List of listed buildings in Kirkden, Angus
 List of listed buildings in Kirriemuir, Angus
 List of listed buildings in Lethnot And Navar, Angus
 List of listed buildings in Liff And Benvie, Angus
 List of listed buildings in Lintrathen, Angus
 List of listed buildings in Lochlee, Angus
 List of listed buildings in Logie Pert, Angus
 List of listed buildings in Lunan, Angus
 List of listed buildings in Lundie, Angus
 List of listed buildings in Mains And Strathmartine, Angus
 List of listed buildings in Maryton, Angus
 List of listed buildings in Menmuir, Angus
 List of listed buildings in Monifieth, Angus
 List of listed buildings in Monikie, Angus
 List of listed buildings in Montrose, Angus
 List of listed buildings in Murroes, Angus
 List of listed buildings in Newtyle, Angus
 List of listed buildings in Oathlaw, Angus
 List of listed buildings in Panbride, Angus
 List of listed buildings in Rescobie, Angus
 List of listed buildings in Ruthven, Angus
 List of listed buildings in Stracathro, Angus
 List of listed buildings in Tannadice, Angus
 List of listed buildings in Tealing, Angus

Angus